Bat mitzvah (Hebrew: בַּת מִצְוָה), a Jewish coming of age ritual for girls.

Bat Mitzvah may also refer to:

Bat Mitzvah massacre, a Palestinian terrorist attack in Hadera, Israel
"Bat Mitzvah Crashers", title of an episode of the series The Mighty B!. See list 
Bat Mitzvah Comes of Age, one of the programs of the Jewish non-profit organization Moving Traditions that runs educational program for teenagers

See also
Bar Mitzvah (disambiguation)
Adult bat mitzvah, a bat mitzvah of a female older than the customary age